Vahid (also Romanized as Vaḩīd, Vohayyad, Voḩayyed, and Voḩeyyed) is a village in Veys Rural District, Veys District, Bavi County, Khuzestan Province, Iran. At the 2006 census, its population was 113, in 11 families.

References 

Populated places in Bavi County